Tô Văn Vệ (born 17 March 1957) is a Vietnamese swimmer. He competed in three events at the 1980 Summer Olympics.

References

External links
 

1957 births
Living people
Vietnamese male swimmers
Olympic swimmers of Vietnam
Swimmers at the 1980 Summer Olympics
Place of birth missing (living people)